Macarena Gómez Traseira (born 2 February 1978) is a Spanish actress. She became known for her many roles in fantasy and horror films. She plays the iconic role of Lola in the television series La que se avecina.

Career
Born on 2 February 1978 in Córdoba, she joined the Maruja Caracuel's Ballet School at a young age. She completed her secondary education in the United States. She trained for three years at the Rose Bruford College of Speech and Drama in London, moving to Madrid afterwards.

After some minor roles in television starting in 1999 (Raquel busca su sitio, El comisario), her film debut was the 2001 horror movie Dagon, portraying mermaid-like priestess Uxía Cambarro. She also starred in the 2008 comedy-horror film Sexykiller.
 
By the end of 2013, right after the beginning of the new season of the soap opera La que se avecina, Macarena Gómez starts presenting TV commercials for the Spanish banking group Bankia.

In 2018 she played Dolores in the biography drama historical film El fotógrafo de Mauthausen along with Mario Casas and Alain Hernández.

Private life
In June 2013, Macarena Gómez married musician and film director Aldo Comas.

Filmography
 The Game of the Cheetah (2022), by Dan Pero Manescu
 Y todos arderán (2021), by David Hebrero
 La Déesse du Crépuscule (2021), by Dan Pero Manescu
 Confinamiento Incluido (2021), by Miguel Martí
 Nadie muere en Ambrosía (2020), by Héctor Valdez
 75 días (2020), by Marc Romero
 Quiero contarte algo''' (2020), by J.K. Álvarez
 The Rodriguez and the Beyond (2019), by Paco Arango 
 Instant Love (2019), by Suso Imbernón and Juanjo Moscardó Rius
 The Crack: Inception (2019), by José Luis Garci
 Trivial (2019), by Sandra Reina and Fran Menchón
 El Cerro de los Dioses (2019), by Daniel M. Caneiro
 Boi (2019), by Jorge M. Fontana
 Camisa de fuerza (2018), by Ivan Mulero
 The Photographer of Mauthausen (2018), by Mar Targarona
 Affection (2018), by Ángel Gómez Hernández
 Up Among the Stars (2018), by Zoe Berriatúa
 Black Label (2018), by David Vergés
 Bicho (2018), by Christopher Cartagena González
 Ma Belle (2017), by Antoni Caimari Caldés
 The Black Gloves (2017), by Lawrie Brewster
 Killing God (2017), by Caye Casas and Albert Pintó
 Pieles (2017), by Eduardo Casanova
 Relaxing Cup of Coffee (2016), by José Semprún
 249. La noche en que una becaria encontró a Emiliano Revilla (2016) by Luis María Ferrández
 Secuestro (2016), by Mar Tarragona
 El desconcierto (2016), by Alberto Carpintero
 Behind (2016), by Ángel Gómez Hernández
 It's My Closet and I Cry If I Want To (2016), by Inés de León
 Void Chair (2016), by Xavier Miralles
 Hijas (2015), by J. Prada and K. Prada
 The Horror Network Vol. 1 (2015), by: Brian Dorton, Joseph Graham, Manuel Marín, Lee Matthews, Douglas Conner and Ignacio Martín Lerma
 Vostok (2015), by Miquel Casals
 Una mañana cualquiera (2015), by Miguel Martí
 The Heroes of Evil (2015), by Zoe Berriatúa
 Witch Girl (2014), by Ricardo Uhagon Vivas
 Shrew's Nest (2014), by Juanfer Andrés and Esteban Roel
 Vibraciones (2014), by Miguel Martí and Alberto Ros
 Bath Time (2014), by Eduardo Casanova
 Blink (2013), by Diego Latorre
 Witching & Bitching (2013), by Álex de la Iglesia
  (2013), by: David Galán Galindo, Roberto Pérez Toledo, Pablo Vara, Javier Botet and Javier Fesser
 Las cinco crisis del Apocalipsis (2013), by Manu Ochoa
 La niña (2012), by Alberto Carpintero
 Papá te quiere mucho (2012), by Lucía Valverde
 Ratas (2012), by Jota Linares
 Y la muerte lo seguía (2012), by Ángel Gómez Hernández
  (2012), by Antonia San Juan
 Holmes & Watson. Madrid Days (2012), by José Luis Garci
 The Curse (2012), by Aldo Comas
 Intereses Mundanos Bar Mut (2011), by Christian Molina and Serpico Ramses Albiñana 
 The Norm (2011), by J. Prada and K. Prada
 La última víctima (2011), by Ángel Gómez Hernández
 Verbo (2011), by Eduardo Chapero-Jackson
 Merry Little Christmas (2011), by Manuel Marín and Ignacio Martín Lerma
 Cementerio de elefantes (2011), by Darío Paso
 Mi primer amanecer (2011), by Chus Gutiérrez
 Quédate conmigo (2010), by Zoe Berriatúa 
 Neon Flesh (2010), by Paco Cabezas
 Miedo (2010), by Jaume Balagueró
 Esto no es amor (2010), by Javier San Román 
 Carlota (2009), by Jorge Mañes and Nilo Mur 
 Un suceso neurasténico en la vida de Ernesto Cadorna (2009), by Fernando Ronchese
 Marisa (2009), by Nacho Vigalondo
 Epílogo (2008), by Zoe Berriatúa
 Vámonos de aquí (2008), by Nydia García
  (2008) by Richard Jordan
 La noche que dejó de llover (2008), by Alfonso Zarauza
 Sexykiller, morirás por ella (2008), by Miguel Martí
 Mejor que nunca (2008), by Dolores Payás
 Acción reacción (2008), by David Ilundain
 Sr. Rosso (2007), by Jaume Balagueró
 La Dama Boba (2006), by Manuel Iborra
  (2006), by Jaume Balagueró
  (2005) by Eduardo Chapero-Jackson
 Luminaria (2005), by Álvaro Giménez Sarmiento
 20 centímetros (2005), by Ramón Salazar
  (2005), by Jacobo Rispa
 El Calentito (2005), by Chus Gutiérrez
  (2005), by Ricardo Bofill
 Rapados (2004), by Román Parrado
 Romasanta: The Werewolf Hunt (2004), by Paco Plaza
 Aurora Borealis (2004), by Lisbeth Dreyer
 Nieves (2003), by Alberto Palma
  (2003), by Óscar Aibar
 Un mystique determinado (2003), by Carles Congost
 S Club Seeing Double (2003), by Nigel Dick 
 Una pasión singular (2003), by Antonio Gonzalo
 O'Donnell 21 (2002), by Yoel Dahan
 Rosas rotas (2001), by Aleix Masferrer López
 Dagon'' (2001), by Stuart Gordon

Television

References

External links 
  
 
 

1978 births
Living people
People from Córdoba, Spain
Spanish film actresses
Spanish television actresses
Actresses from Andalusia
Alumni of Rose Bruford College
20th-century Spanish actresses
21st-century Spanish actresses